Ernesto Vázquez Barreira (born November 5, 1953) is a former Spanish tennis player who a bronze medal at the 1979 Mediterranean Games.

Notes

References

External links

Spanish male tennis players
Living people
1953 births

Mediterranean Games bronze medalists for Spain
Competitors at the 1979 Mediterranean Games
Mediterranean Games medalists in tennis